Gold mining is the extraction of gold resources by mining. Historically, mining gold from alluvial deposits used manual separation processes, such as gold panning. However, with the expansion of gold mining to ores that are not on the surface, has led to more complex extraction processes such as pit mining and gold cyanidation. In the 20th and 21st centuries, most volume of mining was done by large corporations, however the value of gold has led to millions of small, artisanal miners in many parts of the Global South.

Like all mining, human rights and environmental issues are common issues in the gold mining industry. In smaller mines with less regulation, health and safety risks are much higher.

History

The exact date that humans first began to mine gold is unknown, but some of the oldest known gold artifacts were found in the Varna Necropolis in Bulgaria. The graves of the necropolis were built between 4700 and 4200 BC, indicating that gold mining could be at least 7000 years old. A group of German and Georgian archaeologists claims the Sakdrisi site in southern Georgia, dating to the 3rd or 4th millennium BC, may be the world's oldest known gold mine.

Bronze Age gold objects are plentiful, especially in Ireland and Spain, and there are several well known possible sources. Romans used hydraulic mining methods, such as hushing and ground sluicing on a large scale to extract gold from extensive alluvial (loose sediment) deposits, such as those at Las Medulas. Mining was under the control of the state but the mines may have been leased to civilian contractors some time later. The gold served as the primary medium of exchange within the empire, and was an important motive in the Roman invasion of Britain by Claudius in the first century AD, although there is only one known Roman gold mine at Dolaucothi in west Wales. Gold was a prime motivation for the campaign in Dacia when the Romans invaded Transylvania in what is now modern Romania in the second century AD. The legions were led by the emperor Trajan, and their exploits are shown on Trajan's Column in Rome and the several reproductions of the column elsewhere (such as the Victoria and Albert Museum in London). Under the Eastern Roman Empire Emperor Justinian's rule, gold was mined in the Balkans, Anatolia, Armenia, Egypt, and Nubia.

In the area of the Kolar Gold Fields in Bangarpet Taluk, Kolar District of Karnataka state, India, gold was first mined prior to the 2nd and 3rd century AD by digging small pits. (Golden objects found in Harappa and Mohenjo-daro have been traced to Kolar through the analysis of impuritiesthe impurities include 11% silver concentration, found only in KGF ore.) The Champion reef at the Kolar gold fields was mined to a depth of  during the Gupta period in the fifth century AD. During the Chola period in the 9th and 10th century AD, the scale of the operation grew. The metal continued to be mined by the eleventh century kings of South India, the Vijayanagara Empire from 1336 to 1560, and later by Tipu Sultan, the king of Mysore state and the British. It is estimated that the total gold production in Karnataka to date is 1000 tons.

The mining of the Hungarian deposit (present-day Slovakia) primarily around Kremnica was the largest of the Medieval period in Europe.

During the 19th century, numerous gold rushes in remote regions around the globe caused large migrations of miners, such as the California Gold Rush of 1849, the Victorian Gold Rush, and the Klondike Gold Rush. The discovery of gold in the Witwatersrand led to the Second Boer War and ultimately the founding of South Africa. Gold-bearing reefs in the neighbouring Free State province were found shortly thereafter, driving significant development in the region with the establishment of the Free State goldfields.

The Carlin Trend of Nevada, U.S., was discovered in 1961.

As of 2020, the world's largest gold producer was China with 368.3 tonnes of gold mined in that year. The second-largest producer of gold was Russia where 331.1 tonnes was mined in the same year, followed by Australia with 327.8 tonnes.

Statistics 
Despite its decreasing content in ores, gold production is increasing. This increase can be achieved through ever larger-scale industrial installations as well as innovations, especially in hydrometallurgy.

Methods

Hard rock mining 

Hard rock gold mining extracts gold encased in rock, rather than fragments in loose sediment, and produces most of the world's gold.  Sometimes open-pit mining is used, such as at the Fort Knox Mine in central Alaska. Barrick Gold Corporation has one of the largest open-pit gold mines in North America located on its Goldstrike mine property in north eastern Nevada.  Other gold mines use underground mining, where the ore is extracted through tunnels or shafts.  South Africa has the world's deepest hard rock gold mine up to  underground.  At such depths, the heat is unbearable for humans, and air conditioning is required for the safety of the workers. The first such mine to receive air conditioning was Robinson Deep, at that time the deepest mine in the world for any mineral.

By-product gold mining
Gold is also produced by mining in which it is not the principal product. Large copper mines, such as the Bingham Canyon mine in Utah, often recover considerable amounts of gold and other metals along with copper.  Some sand and gravel pits, such as those around Denver, Colorado, may recover small amounts of gold in their wash operations.  The largest producing gold mine in the world, the Grasberg mine in Papua, Indonesia, is primarily a copper mine.

A modest amount of precious metal is a by-product of sodium production.

Niche, recreational, or historical methods

Placer mining

Placer mining is the technique by which gold that has accumulated in a placer deposit is extracted. Placer deposits are composed of relatively loose material that makes tunnelling difficult, and so most means of extracting it involve the use of water or dredging.

Sluicing

Using a sluice box to extract gold from placer deposits has long been a very common practice in prospecting and small-scale mining. A sluice box is essentially a man made channel with riffles set in the bottom. The riffles are designed to create dead zones in the current to allow gold to drop out of suspension. The box is placed in the stream to channel water flow. Gold-bearing material is placed at the top of the box. The material is carried by the current through the volt where gold and other dense material settles out behind the riffles. Less dense material flows out of the box as tailings.

Larger commercial placer mining operations employ screening plants, or trommels, to remove the larger alluvial materials such as boulders and gravel, before concentrating the remainder in a sluice box or jig plant.  These operations typically include diesel powered, earth moving equipment, including excavators, bulldozers, wheel loaders, and rock trucks.

Dredging

Although this method has largely been replaced by modern methods, some dredging is done by small-scale miners using suction dredges.  These are small machines that float on the water and are usually operated by one or two people.  A suction dredge consists of a sluice box supported by pontoons, attached to a suction hose which is controlled by a miner working beneath the water.

State dredging permits in many of the United States gold dredging areas specify a seasonal time period and area closures to avoid conflicts between dredgers and the spawning time of fish populations.  Some US states, such as Montana, require an extensive permitting procedure, including permits.

Some large suction dredges ( & ) are used in commercial production throughout the world.  Small suction dredges are much more efficient at extracting smaller gold than the old bucket line.  This has improved the chances of finding gold.  Smaller dredges with  suction tubes are used to sample areas behind boulders and along potential pay streaks, until "colour" (gold) appears.

Other larger scale dredging operations take place on exposed river gravel bars at seasonal low water.  These operations typically use a land based excavator to feed a gravel screening plant and sluice box floating in a temporary pond.  The pond is excavated in the gravel bar and filled from the natural water table.  "Pay" gravel is excavated from the front face of the pond and processed through the floating plant, with the gold trapped in the onboard sluice box and tailings stacked behind the plant, steadily filling in the back of the pond as the operation moves forward. This type of gold mining is characterized by its low cost, as each rock is moved only once.  It also has low environmental impact, as no stripping of vegetation or overburden is necessary, and all process water is fully recycled.  Such operations are typical on New Zealand's South Island and in the Klondike region of Canada.

Rocker box
Also called a cradle, a rocker box uses riffles located in a high-walled box to trap gold in a similar manner to the sluice box.  A rocker box uses less water than a sluice box and is well suited for areas where water is limited.  A rocking motion provides the water movement needed for the gravity separation of gold in placer material.

Gold ore processing

Cyanide process

Cyanide extraction of gold is the dominant method for obtaining gold. Finely ground rock is treated with a solution of sodium cyanide.  The extract is absorbed onto carbon. The gold can be removed from the carbon by using a strong solution of caustic soda and cyanide. Gold cyanide is then converted to relatively pure gold by a variety of methods. 

The technique using dissolution with alkaline cyanide has been highly developed over recent years. It is particularly appropriate for low grade gold and silver ore processing (e.g. less than 5 ppm gold) but its use is not restricted to such ores. There are many environmental hazards associated with this extraction method, largely due to the high acute toxicity of the cyanide compounds. As a consequence, most countries now have strict regulations for cyanide in plant discharges, and plants today include a specific cyanide-destruction step before discharging their tailings to a storage facility.

Mercury process

Historically, mercury was used extensively in placer gold mining in order to form mercury-gold amalgam with smaller gold particles, and thereby increase the gold recovery rates. Large-scale use of mercury stopped in the 1960s. However, mercury is still used in artisanal and small-scale gold mining (ASGM), often clandestine, gold prospecting.

Business

Small operations 

While most of the gold is produced by major corporations, millions of people work independently in smaller, artisan operations, in some cases illegally. Artisanal mining refers to workers who use rudimentary methods to extract and process minerals and metals. Socially and economically marginalized communities mine to escape extreme poverty, unemployment and landlessness.

In Ghana, the galamseys are estimated to number 20,000 to 50,000. In neighboring francophone countries, such workers are called orpailleurs. In Brazil, such workers are called garimpeiros. The word garimpeiros is also used in Venezuela, Suriname and French Guiana, because many illegal gold prospectors are from Brazil.

There are an estimated 10 to 15 million artisanal and small-scale gold miners worldwide. 4.5 million of them are women. Miner's risks include persecution by government, mine shaft collapses, and toxic poisoning from unsafe chemicals used in processing.

The high risk of such ventures was seen in the collapse of an illegal mine at Dompoase, Ashanti Region, Ghana, on 12 November 2009, when 18 workers were killed, including 13 women. Many women work at such mines as porters. It was the worst mining disaster in Ghanaian history.

In order to maximize gold extraction, mercury is often used to amalgamate with the metal. The gold is produced by boiling away the mercury from the amalgam. Mercury is effective in extracting very small gold particles, but the process is hazardous due to the toxicity of mercury vapour.

Especially after the Minamata Convention has been ratified, there are initiatives to replace or reduce the use and emissions of mercury in the extraction of gold.

There are an estimated 600,000 children working in illegal artisanal gold mines.

For hours, children dig, crush, mill, and haul ore in the hot sun. Children stand in water, digging sand and silt from riverbeds. They carry heavy bags of mud with their heads to designated sieving and washing sites. Children suffer the effects of noise, vibration, overexertion, poor ventilation, and exhaustion. Children's lives are put at risk by rock fall, explosions, the collapsing of tunnels and mine shafts, falling into open shafts and pits, and breathing air polluted by dust and toxic gas. Having immune systems that are not fully developed makes children especially vulnerable to dust and chemical exposure. Injuries include serious respiratory conditions, constant headaches, hearing and sight problems, joint disorders and various dermatological, muscular and orthopaedic ailments and wounds.

Large companies

Adverse effects and responses

Gold mining can significantly alter the natural environment. For example, gold mining activities in tropical forests are increasingly causing deforestation along rivers and in remote areas rich in biodiversity. Other gold mining impacts, particularly in aquatic systems with residual cyanide or mercury (used in the recovery of gold from ore), can be highly toxic to people and wildlife even at relatively low concentrations.

However, there are clear moves by many in the non-governmental organization community to encourage more environmentally friendly and sustainable business practices in the mining industry. The primary way this is being achieved is via the promotion of so-called 'clean' or 'ethical' gold. The aim is to get all end users/retailers of gold to adhere to set of principles that encourage sustainable mining. Campaigns such as 'No Dirty Gold' are driving the message that the mining industry is harmful (for the reasons noted above), and so must be cleaned up. Also, NGOs are urging the industry and consumers to buy sustainably produced gold. 

Human Rights Watch produced a report in 2015 that outlined some of challenges faced globally. The report notes that 
 Along with many other reports and articles, this has had the effect of spurring retailers and industry bodies to move toward sustainable gold. Indeed, the World Jewellery Confederation insists that it does all it can to "Deliver a Sustainable and Responsible Jewellery Industry".

Fairtrade and Fairmined dual certification for gold was launched across the United Kingdom on 14 February 2011, a joint scheme between The Fairtrade Foundation and The Association for Responsible Mining. The Fairmined mark ensures that the gold has been extracted in a fair and responsible manner.

The Fairtrade Standard for Gold and Associated Precious Metals for Artisanal and Small-Scale Mining was adopted in 2013, and the Fairtrade Foundation reports on a number of technical uses and  responsible suppliers of Fairtrade Certified Gold. The Fairtrade Foundation launched a free course aimed at sales staff responsible for selling gold jewellery in 2017.

A UN investigation reported human rights abuses such as sexual exploitation of women and children, mercury poisoning and child labor affecting communities where illegal gold production occurs. The reports said global buyers such as Switzerland, through which roughly two-thirds of global trade transits, need to ensure that human rights are respected throughout supply chains.

The discovery of significant gold deposits in a region often sees a flood of resources and development, which lasts as long as the mines are economic. When goldfields begin to decline in production, local economies find themselves destabilised and overly reliant upon an industry that will inevitably abandon the region when gold deposits are sufficiently depleted.

Safety

Noise 
Within the United States, the Mine Safety and Health Administration (MSHA) has set noise exposure limits for those within the mining industry. These noise exposure guidelines state that the "Permissible Exposure Level" (PEL) of noise is 90 dBA as an 8-hour time-weighted-average. Mine workers exposed to a time-weighted average of at least 85 dBA fall into the "Action Level" in which workers with exposures exceeding that level are placed into a hearing conservation program. The National Institute for Occupational Safety and Health (NIOSH) has examined noise exposures of gold mine workers. One study found that gold mine workers noise exposures ranged from 165 to 261% of the MSHA PEL. Haul truck operators, load-haul-dump operators, single boom drill operators, and roof bolter operators represented the occupations with the highest noise exposures within gold mines.

See also

 Sibanye Gold
 Gold extraction
 Gold rush
 Gold prospecting
 Ore genesis
 Peak gold
 Quartz reef mining
 Recreational gold mining
 List of gold nuggets by size

Gold mining by country:

 Witwatersrand around Johannesburg, South Africa
 Witwatersrand Basin in South Africa
 Deepest mines on earth are the gold mines in South Africa
Gold mining in Brazil
 Gold mining in Africa
 Gold mining in South Africa
 Gold mining in Australia
 Gold mining in the United States
 Gold mining in Alaska
 City of Gold in Canada
 Gold mining in China
  Gold mining in India
 Hatti Gold Mines
 Kolar Gold Fields
 Gold mining in Guyana
 Aurora gold mine
 Omai mine
 Toroparu mine
 Gold mining in Pakistan:
 Reko Diq Mine
 Saindak Copper Gold Project
 Welsh gold
 Sukari, Egypt

Gold rushes:

United States:
Georgia Gold Rush (beginning 1828)
California Gold Rush (1848–1855)
Pike's Peak Gold Rush (1858–1860)
Holcomb Valley gold rush (1860s)
British Commonwealth:
Australian gold rushes (1850s)
Victorian Gold Rush (1851–1860s)
Fraser Canyon Gold Rush (late 1850s), Canada
Witwatersrand Gold Rush (1880s), South Africa
Klondike Gold Rush (1896–1899), Canada
Central Otago Gold Rush (1860s), New Zealand

References

Further reading

 Gudde, Erwin G. California Gold Camps: A Geographical and Historical Dictionary of Camps, Towns, and Localities Where Gold Was Found and Mined; Wayside Stations and Trading Centers (Univ of California Press, 1975).
 Hess, Frank L., C. W. Hayes, and W. Lindgren. "Gold mining in the Randsburg quadrangle, California." Contributions to Economic Geology: US Geological Survey Bulletin (1910): 23–47. Online
 Kelley, Robert L. "Forgotten Giant: The Hydraulic Gold Mining Industry In California." Pacific Historical Review 23.4 (1954): 343–356. Online
 Paul, Rodman Wilson, ed. The California Gold Discovery: Sources, Documents, Accounts, and Memoirs Relating to the Discovery of Gold at Sutter's Mill (Talisman Press, 1967), Primary sources.
 Rohe, Randall E. "Hydraulicking in the American West: The development and diffusion of a mining technique." Montana: The Magazine of Western History (1985) 35#2 to: 18–35. Online
 Rohe, Randall. "Origins & Diffusion of Traditional Placer Mining in the West" Material Culture 18#3 (1986), pp. 127–166 Online
 White F. Miner with a Heart of Gold: biography of a mineral science and engineering educator. Friesen Press, Victoria. 2020. ISBN 978-1-5255-7765-9 (Hardcover), 978-1-5255-7766-6 (Paperback), 978-1-5255-7767-3 (eBook).

External links
 Gold Ore Resources Status and Annual Production of Countries by Continent

 
Economic geology

de:Gold#Gewinnung